Four Fronts (Cuatro Frentes in Spanish) is a board game created by the Uruguayan professor Gabriel Baldi Lemonnier.

History 
It was created in 2012 by Lemonnier, who invented and patented it as «Ajedrez Uruguayo» (Uruguayan Chess).

It is a variant of chess, for two, three or four opponents who play in pairs or individually, although when playing in pairs, partners cannot speak. It involves moving the pieces through the checkered gameboard of black or white, with the intention of capturing. To the standard board of eight by eight frames, four sections were added to the respective formations.

The pieces are 12 per player: the king, the queen, the bishop, the knight, rook and the pawn, incorporating as a novelty the prince, a piece that combines the movements of the bishop and the rook. The pieces are colored white, black, yellow and red.

References

External links

Chess variants
2012 in chess
Board games introduced in 2012